Whitesell is a surname. Notable people with the surname include:

 Josh Whitesell (born 1982), American major league baseball player
 Patrick Whitesell (born 1965), American talent agent and co-CEO of WME Entertainment
 Sean Whitesell (1963–2015), American film and television actor
 Brian Whitesell (born 1964), American auto racing team manager
 Christopher Whitesell, American television soap opera writer
 Jim Whitesell (born 1959),  American college basketball coach
 John Whitesell, American television and film director